Goševo may refer to:

 Goševo (Novi Pazar), a village in Serbia
 Goševo (Sjenica), a village in Serbia